The fourth season of the American television spy drama Burn Notice premiered on June 3, 2010 on the cable television channel USA Network.   Coby Bell joined the main cast as Jesse Porter, a counter-intelligence agent Michael unwittingly burns.

Season overview 
As the fourth season opens, Michael sits alone in a well-furnished room, where he meets his new handler, Vaughn (Robert Wisdom). Vaughn attempts to lure Michael into the organization by attempting to befriend him, and tells Michael the organization is now on the hunt for a terrorist mastermind. Michael agrees to work with Vaughn on the condition Vaughn does not interfere or question his methods. Vaughn agrees, but as they begin their search, Michael is duped into burning another domestic spy, a counter-intelligence agent named Jesse Porter (Coby Bell). Jesse, unaware of who burned him, seeks out Michael for assistance. Michael brings Jesse into his team to restore Jesse to his previous position but soon learns he plans to kill whoever burned him.

The trail of the terrorist mastermind leads back to Simon (Garret Dillahunt), who informs Michael that a powerful international telecommunications businessman, John Barrett (Robert Patrick), has what Michael needs to dismantle the organization. Simon gives Michael a tape proving Vaughn helped burn him, and a bible that can be used to decode an as-yet-unknown document. Using the bible as bait, Michael lures Barrett to Miami to discuss what it decodes. At the same time Barrett arrives in Miami, Jesse learns it was Michael who burned him. Michael goes ahead with the meeting, unsure of Jesse's willingness to come to his aid.

In the mid-season finale, Barrett reveals that the bible decodes a  non-official cover (NOC) list naming the members of the organization. Vaughn, however, spoils Michael's plan by showing up with guns blazing at the meeting. Thanks to some timely but painful assistance from Jesse (shooting Michael through the shoulder to free him from a chokehold), Michael and Barrett flee the scene and crash, and Michael is seen bleeding out as someone wearing military boots takes the briefcase containing the bible. Barrett is killed in the crash.

As it turns out, Fiona and Sam had determined that the mystery man was one of Barrett's men named Sweeney. Sweeney had a hidden agenda and attempted to use an outside source to decode the bible. However, Jesse and Michael find Sweeney dead and Sweeney's partner/killer on the run. The four track him through to the Dominican Republic and take back the list, which is stored on a thumb drive and already decoded by Sweeney's partner. Afterward, they ponder the possibilities of how to properly flush out those whose names are on the list.

After much consideration, Michael decides to hand the list to Marv (Richard Kind), Jesse's old handler whom Jesse trusts fully. Despite much difficulty in convincing Marv, they finally meet to hand over the list, but the plan unravels when Michael's old nemesis Tyler Brennen (Jay Karnes) hears of the transaction and holds Marv's wife hostage. The meet ends with Brennen in possession of the list and Marv dead. Threatening to send Vaughn the audio recordings of Michael's conversations with Marv, Brennen blackmails Michael into identifying and killing people on the list, hiring Larry Sizemore (Tim Matheson) to assist and monitor Michael. Instead, after Michael learns the location of the list, Larry double-crosses and kills Brennen in hopes of retrieving the list himself. But Larry finds that Fiona, Sam, and Jesse had already recovered it, and he is forced to wait for the police to arrest him after Sam trains a laser-sighted rifle at him.

After Vaughn learns of Michael's betrayal and possession of the list, he mobilizes a large force to kill Michael and retrieve it. He uses the organization's "bought off" agents in government and law enforcement to deny Michael, Fiona, and Jesse any help. While this is going on, Sam and Madeline contact a United States Congressman (John Doman), whom they had met in a previous episode, for help. While he is initially skeptical, given their history, he is eventually convinced and sends a military team to save Michael and Fiona. The season ends with Michael being whisked away to Washington, D.C. to meet a man identified as Raines (Dylan Baker), who tells him, "Welcome back."

Cast

Main 
 Jeffrey Donovan as Michael Westen
 Gabrielle Anwar as Fiona Glenanne
 Coby Bell as Jesse Porter
 Bruce Campbell as Sam Axe
 Sharon Gless as Madeline Westen

Recurring 
 Robert Wisdom as Vaughn Anderson
 Richard Kind as Marvin "Marv" Peterson 
 Navi Rawat as Kendra
 Paul Tei as Barry Burkowski
 Marc Macaulay as Agent Harris
 Brandon Morris as Agent Lane 
 Jay Karnes as Tyler Brennen
 John Doman as Bill Cowley
 Robert Patrick as John Barrett
 Danny Pino as Adam Scott
 Tommy Groth as Rudy 
 Arturo Fernandez as Sugar  
 Garret Dillahunt as Simon Escher 
 Callie Thorne as Natalie Rice 
 Seth Peterson as Nate Westen   
 Adam Clark as Tony Soto  
 Tim Matheson as "Dead" Larry Sizemore   
 Dylan Baker as Raines

The main cast from the previous three seasons returned, with one addition.  Jeffrey Donovan returned as Michael Westen, Gabrielle Anwar as Fiona Glenanne, Bruce Campbell as Sam Axe, and Sharon Gless as Madeline Westen.  Coby Bell joined the cast as a counter-intelligence expert, Jesse Porter, whom Michael unwittingly burns.

Like the first three seasons, the fourth included several recurring guests.  Robert Wisdom made several appearances as Vaughn, Michael's point of contact with Management.  Garret Dillahunt returned as Simon Escher, the man who committed the crimes used to burn Michael.  Navi Rawat portrayed Kendra, an assassin.  Seth Peterson reprised his role as Michael's brother, Nate, while Paul Tei returned as money-launderer Barry Burkowski.  Arturo Fernandez returned for one episode as Sugar, Michael's former neighbor and a drug dealer.  Marc Macaulay and Brandon Morris returned for multiple appearances as Agents Harris and Lane.  The character of John Barrett, played by Robert Patrick, was introduced as a part of the conspiracy behind Michael's burn.  Tim Matheson and Jay Karnes returned, in the same episode, as villains "Dead" Larry Sizemore and Tyler Brennen. Richard Kind guest starred in three episodes as Marv, Jesse's old handler.  John Doman appeared as Congressman Bill Cowley in two episodes.  Other notable one-time guests included Adam Clark, Alan Dale, Benito Martinez, Burt Reynolds, Michael Rooker, Callie Thorne, and Frank Whaley. Dylan Baker can be seen in the last few moments of the final episode as Raines, the man who welcomes Michael back into the agency.

Episodes

References

External links 
 

2010 American television seasons